The Maryland Republican Party is the Maryland state branch of the Republican Party (GOP), headquartered in Annapolis. As of 2023, the party holds none of the statewide elected offices, holds only 1 of Maryland's congressional districts, and holds a superminority of the seats in both chambers of the General Assembly.

Current elected officials

Members of Congress
U.S. Senate
None
Both of Maryland's U.S. Senate seats have been held by Democrats since 1987. Charles Mathias was the last Republican to represent Maryland in the U.S. Senate.

U.S. House of Representatives

Statewide offices
None

State legislature
Senate minority leader: Stephen S. Hershey Jr.
Senate minority Whip: Justin Ready
House minority leader: Jason Buckel
House minority Whip: Christopher Adams

State party

Historically, the Republican Party has been very weak in Maryland. The Republican Party is the minority party in both houses of the Maryland General Assembly. In the House of Delegates, the Republicans control 39 seats to the Democrats' 102. In the Maryland State Senate, the Republicans control 13 seats to the Democrats' 34. Since 1854, the Republican Party has controlled both chambers of the General Assembly for only 5 years. There have been only 9 Republican governors of Maryland, and just 2 of those have managed to win re-election. In 2022, the Republican gubernatorial candidate, Dan Cox, lost by a landslide margin of 32.41%, which was the largest loss for any gubernatorial nominee since 1986, in which Republican Thomas J. Mooney lost by a margin of 64.74%.

The Republican Party enjoys widespread support from Western Maryland and the Eastern Shore, both of which are mainly rural. In other areas of the state such as heavily populated Montgomery County, Prince George's County, and the City of Baltimore, Republicans are a minority.

The majority of voters in the state of Maryland live in urban metropolitan areas such as Baltimore and are affiliated with the Democratic Party.

In 2003, Michael Steele became the first African American elected to statewide office in the state of Maryland, when he was elected lieutenant governor. Prior to this, Steele served as the chairman of the Maryland Republican Party. In 2009, Michael S. Steele was elected chair of the Republican National Committee, the first African American to hold that position.

Financial status

The Washington Post characterized the party as "close to broke" as of January 2009, with $703.10 on hand and $57,000 in loans and bills. The Maryland Election Board also ruled in 2009 that the Maryland GOP must return $77,500 to a campaign account of Steele's for party legal expenses that he had paid.  In November 2011 The Baltimore Sun reported that the Maryland Republican party owed over $100,000 to vendors that stemmed from the 2010 election cycle.

The picture changed after Republican Larry Hogan was elected as governor in November 2014.  According to The Washington Post, "Hogan raised nearly $1.4 million in the two months after the election" and the state party raised another $1 million.

Notable Maryland Republicans
Robert L. Ehrlich, Jr. was the first Republican governor of Maryland since the 1960s, serving as governor from 2003 to 2007. He was defeated in the 2010 election by Democratic candidate Martin O'Malley. Ehrlich's wife, Kendel Ehrlich, is a notable state Republican who hosts, along with her husband, a conservative talk radio show on WBAL 1090-AM in Baltimore.  Andy Harris was one of the few bright spots for Maryland Republicans in the 2010 election as he won a congressional seat back from the Democrats.

Nicholaus R. Kipke became the House minority leader in 2013, by unseating Anthony J. O'Donnell.

Larry Hogan was the most recent Republican governor, he defeated Democratic candidate Anthony Brown in November 2014. Boyd Rutherford was Hogan's running mate and was Lt. Governor of Maryland.

In 2018, Hogan won re-election as governor against Democratic challenger, Ben Jealous. This made him the first two-term Republican governor of Maryland since Theodore Roosevelt McKeldin.

Current leadership 
The current officers of the Maryland Republican Party were elected at the fall 2022 convention to two year terms with the exception of the national committeeman and committeewomen who were elected at the spring 2022 convention to four-year terms.

In December 2022, the Maryland Republican Party elected Nicole Beus Harris, the wife of U.S. Representative Andy Harris, to serve as its chair following the resignation of Dirk Haire.

The Maryland Republican Party also employs several staff members, including an executive director, a deputy director, and a data director.

State party chairmen

References

External links

Maryland Republican Party
Maryland Young Republicans
Maryland Federation of College Republicans

 
1854 establishments in Maryland
Republican Party
Republican Party (United States) by state